Club Deportivo Municipal Mejillones SADP is a Chilean Football club, their home town is the commune of Mejillones, Chile. They currently play in the fourth level of Chilean football, the Tercera División.

The club were founded on April 7, 2005 and played seven seasons in the Tercera División and one season in the Segunda División.

Seasons played
1 season in Segunda División
7 seasons in Tercera División

Current squad

Titles

None

See also 
 Chilean football league system

External links 

Mejillones
Mejillones
Sport in Antofagasta Region
2005 establishments in Chile